A farm truck is a vehicle designated for agricultural use, and may include anything from small pick-up trucks or even vehicles fashioned out of old parts, to class 8 eighteen-wheeler trucks. Some states in the United States have a special registration for farm trucks that includes restrictions such as distance the vehicle may travel from the farm.

Asia
In Asia, farm truck generally refers to small four-wheel trucks or transporters many times manufactured in artisanal or small rural and peri-urban workshops) and in larger factories in developing countries of Asia. They can be classified as an intermediate means of transport. They usually consist of simple rail-type frames, with axles, brakes and steering assemblies cobbled from new or second-hand vehicular spare parts and are generally powered by single-cylinder diesel and petrol engines.

Farm trucks of Thailand 
In Thailand, such trucks are known as rot i-taen. Manufactured as early as the mid-1950s, these artfully painted, polished teak sideboards,  Thai farm trucks can be frequently seen in various parts of rural Thailand transporting farm produce, rice threshers, and people. These are not to be confused with the songthaew pickup trucks. The Tallythong factory in Panatnikhom, Chonburi   manufactures Superbull farm truck.

Jugaad Trucks of India
Jugaad's literal meaning in Hindi and other Indo-Aryan languages is "hack". Jugaad could be used as a term for any low-cost vehicle which typically costs under $1000.00. Jugaads are powered by single-cylinder diesel engines originally intended to power agricultural irrigation pumps and can be considered a cost-effective transportation solutions for rural Indians, Pakistanis and Bangladeshis. Although by law they cannot be registered and therefore not allowed on the road, they are also rarely regulated as they inexpensively fulfill a very felt need in rural areas of the three countries.

The jugaad farm truck used in North India is called by various names, including peter rehra, gharukka, maruta, dhindsa and kisan gari.

Mini-trucks
Also known as mini trucks, micro-trucks or light commercial vehicle – LCV in India. They are among the smallest class of commercial 4-wheel trucks usually in the 500 kg cargo range and powered by < 20 HP engines. In Japan they are known as Keitora or Kei trucks and produced  Mitsubishi- Minicab, Suzuki- Carry and Daihatsu- Hijet. In China they are known as farm trucks and available from such manufacturers as Vantage, DFM, WuLing, Marathon, MAG, etc. Their use in South Asia has spread quickly from urban areas to rural areas for cargo but also as for people carriers. In India these include the Tata Ace, Mahendra Gio, Piaggio Ape.

Further reading

 A Not So Quiet Transport Revolution in Bangladesh:: A case study on rural motorized three-wheelers  https://web.archive.org/web/20110727105536/http://www.naef-nepal.org/IMTs%20of%20Bangladesh.pdf
 Starkey, Paul, Simon Ellis, John Hine, and Anna Ternell (2002). Improving Rural Mobility: Options for Developing Motorized and Nonmotorized Transport in Rural Areas. World Bank Technical Papers No 525. Washington, World Bank.

Innovation and a Global Knowledge Economy in India, Thomas Birtchnell, a lecturer of Sustainable Communities at University of Wollongong, Australia

Trucks